The Four Thieves Vinegar Collective is an anarchist biohacking group founded in 2015 by Michael Laufer. They have published instructions for the "EpiPencil", an epinephrine autoinjector, and the "Apothecary MicroLab", a do-it-yourself (DIY) device intended to make a variety of medications, most notably pyrimethamine (Daraprim). They have been criticized by the medical community for causing potential harm to patients with the DIY instructions, but Laufer claims to defend people's right to attempt their own medical treatment.

Members
Four Thieves' membership is generally composed of technically-trained people, but does not include medical professionals.

Views
Laufer has compared his work to that of Women on Waves, a group that provides abortion medication to women in areas where abortion is illegal. His motivation in founding the group is to provide medication to people when it is too expensive for them to afford, is illegal to acquire, or is unavailable due to it treating an orphan disease. He believes that providing lifesaving medication to any that need it justifies violating intellectual property rights of pharmaceutical companies, and supports cognitive liberty.

History
Laufer, who is trained in mathematics, decided to form the group in 2008 during a graduate school trip to El Salvador. While visiting a local medical clinic he learned that despite the existence of many clandestine chemistry labs producing methamphetamine and MDMA, the clinic was out of oral contraceptives. He investigated the possibility of DIY pharmaceuticals which culminated in the founding of Four Thieves in 2015. He took the name from four thieves vinegar, a legendary plague cure.

Four Thieves had formerly partnered with Chematica to develop recipes for the group's medication, but this ended and they lost access to information and software they had been given after pharmaceutical company Merck bought the startup.

EpiPencil
In 2016, after the price for an EpiPen was raised from $57 to $318 by its manufacturer Mylan, Four Thieves released instructions for how to build an "EpiPencil", a homemade epinephrine autoinjector that can be built for $30. It is made from three off-the-shelf parts. It has been criticized for potential danger. Theresa Eisenman, a spokeswoman for the United States Food and Drug Administration, stated that using such a device is a "potentially dangerous practice". The device is not known to have actually been used.

Apothecary MicroLab
Four Thieves has released instructions for building an "Apothecary MicroLab", a DIY device claimed to be able to synthesize a variety of medications. The group released instructions for manufacturing pyrimethamine (Daraprim) from acetonitrile, ethyl bromide, and dicyandiamide with it. Laufer claims that it can also be used to make naloxone, cabotegravir, mifepristone, and misoprostol. Jeremiah Johnson, a researcher at the Massachusetts Institute of Technology, has stated that using it would be very dangerous as it could create the wrong drug or the wrong dose. Eric von Hippel, an economist at MIT who supports DIY medication, has stated that the design could create chemical byproducts as well as or instead of the intended medication.

Laufer claims that they have successfully synthesized cabotegravir, an experimental new integrase inhibitor, and asked heroin dealers to cut their product with it in order to help lower the rates of HIV infection among heroin users.

Abortion
In 2022, Four Thieves released detailed instructions for how to make an abortion pill, and subsequently distributed business cards at a hacker convention in Queens, New York that were labeled "This Card is an Abortion" and had three doses of misoprostol embedded in them.

Reception
Jose Gomez-Marquez, who is researching pharmaceuticals at MIT, has stated his belief that the group is more about publicity than medication, and is concerned about the danger of unvetted information being published. Vinay Prasad, a professor of medicine at Oregon Health & Science University, believes that DIY medication is "foolhardy".

Jo Zayner, another biohacker, believes that the group's work is more symbolic than anything else.

Chemist Derek Lowe described the Vice magazine article on the collective as "largely bullshit". He noted that they had synthesized known substances rather than producing new ones. He also pointed out that their proposal to combat Hepatitis C could accidentally cause treatment-resistant strains of Hepatitis C.

Legal status
Patricia Zettler, a former attorney at the FDA, believes that Four Thieves' work is legal because they are only providing information rather than drugs themselves.

See also
 CRISPR
 Direct action
 Martin Shkreli

References

External links 
 

Anarchist communities
Citizen science
Hacker culture
Do it yourself
Intellectual property activism